Anne-Laure Heitz (born 15 March 1982) is a former professional tennis player from France.

Biography
A right-handed player, Heitz comes from the French city of Mulhouse, near the borders of Germany and Switzerland.

Heitz made her WTA Tour main-draw debut as a qualifier in the doubles at the 2001 Internationaux de Tennis Feminin Nice.

From 2001 to 2003, she received a wild card into the French Open women's doubles draw, with her best performance a second-round appearance in 2001, partnering Élodie Le Bescond.

As a singles player, she had a ranking on tour of 213 in the world, winning four ITF titles.

She has served as coach of the Luxembourg Fed Cup team.

ITF finals

Singles (4–6)

Doubles (1–2)

References

External links
 
 

1982 births
Living people
French female tennis players
French tennis coaches
Sportspeople from Mulhouse